This list is limited to unmodified production cars which meet the eligibility criteria below. All entries must be able to be verified from reliable sources. Up to one percent decline from start to finish is allowed. Times driven privately or by manufacturers need the presence of an independent, reliable source or at least some video footage to confirm the car and tire condition to qualify as independent.

Eligible cars

Because of the inconsistencies with the various definitions of production cars, dubious claims by manufacturers and self-interested groups, and inconsistent or changing application of the definitions, this list has a defined set of requirements. For further explanation of how these were arrived at see the links above.

Production car definition
For the purposes of this list a production car is defined as:

 Being constructed principally for retail sale to consumers for their personal use, and to transport people on public roads (no commercial or industrial vehicles are eligible);
 Fitted with the original manufacturer-supplied road tires;
 Having had 25 or more articles made by the original vehicle manufacturer and offered for commercial sale to the public in new condition (pre-production prototypes, and cars modified by either professional tuners or individuals, are not eligible);
 Being street-legal in their intended markets and capable of passing any official tests or inspections required to be granted this status.

Only independent times may be listed. Many elements change how fast the car can accelerate to 60 mph. Tires, elevation above sea level, weight of the driver, testing equipment, weather conditions and surface of testing track all influence these times. One-foot rollout before the timer starts is used by some North American publications, so times from which the first foot of acceleration was subtracted are allowed.

By 1/4 mile or 402 meter times (11.0 seconds or less)

By 0–100 km/h (0–62 mph) time (3.0 seconds or less) 
These are standing start (no rollout allowed) acceleration times measured by independent, reliable sources.

Table notes

See also
List of fastest production cars
List of production cars by power output
List of production cars by specific power

References

Car performance
fastest
Car-related lists